XHRPU-FM is a radio station on 102.9 FM in Durango, Durango, Mexico. It is owned by Multimedios Radio and carries its La Lupe variety hits format.

History

XERPU-AM 1370 received its concession in November 1974. It added an FM combo station in 1994.

In 2015, several subsidiaries of Grupo Radio México, this station included, were merged into Grupo Radio Centro, which is owned by the same family.

On October 18, 2019, operation of XHRPU-FM, GRC's only station in the city of Durango, was transferred to Multimedios Radio, which flipped the station to its La Lupe variety hits format. It is Multimedios's first radio station in the area. On January 8, 2020, the station presented the Federal Telecommunications Institute with the surrender of its 1,000-watt AM facility, remaining on FM only.

External links
 Official website

References

1974 establishments in Mexico
Radio stations established in 1974
Mass media in Durango City
Radio stations in Durango
Radio stations in Mexico
Spanish-language radio stations
Multimedios Radio